Pahalgam, known as Pahalgom (in Kashmiri) is a town and a notified area committee, near Anantnag city in the Anantnag district of the Indian-administered union territory of Jammu and Kashmir. It is a popular tourist destination and hill station. Its lush green meadows and pristine waters attract thousands of tourists from all over the world each year. Pahalgam is the headquarters of one of the eleven tehsils of Anantnag district.

Pahalgam is associated with the annual pilgrimage to the shrine Amarnath Yatra. The town is the starting point of the yatra that takes place every year in the months of July–August, receiving hundreds of thousands of tourists. Because of its religious significance and role as a base camp, the town attracts 70% of visitors to the valley. This flood of tourists overwhelms some of the local infrastructure, especially waste management in the town.

Etymology
The name Pahalgam is derived from two Kashmiri words;

Puheyl (shepherd} and goam (village) over the time became Puheylgoam or Pahalgam. The place acts as a gateway to many meadows and pastures and traditional Bakharwal communities settle there from spring season to pre-winter, herding their cattle. 

According to Hindu traditions, Pahalgam was originally called Bail Gaon (बैल गाँव) meaning (village of bull (nandi)), in other words, where Shiva left his bull before entering Amarnath Cave

Geography
Pahalgam holds a central position in the Lidder Valley.

Climate
Pahalgam has a temperate climate with long and cold winter and short and mild summer.

Demographics

 India census, Pahalgam had a population of 5922. Males constitute 56% of the population and females 44%. The average literacy rate is 35%, lower than the Indian national average of 59.5% with male literacy at 49% and female literacy at 17%. About 14% of the population is under 6 years of age.

Administration
Pahalgam is administered by the Pahalgam Development Authority, headed by a Chief Executive Officer who functions as  the administrator of local town area committee.

Tourism
The town has 3,510 rooms with 7,020 beds for tourists.

Amarnath Temple

Amarnath cave is a Hindu shrine located in Pahalgam. The cave is situated at an altitude of 3,888 m (12,756 ft).

Kolhoi Glacier

Kolohoi Glacier, situated up the Lidder Valley, just below Kolhoi Peak is currently a hanging glacier. It is accessible from Pahalgam via Aru and is known to have extended for at least . According to the mountaineers from Jawahar Institute of Mountaineering, in 2008, the glacier receded by half since 1985 and it is not safe to study because it is hollow and has  crevices.

Betaab Valley

Also known as Hagoon or Hagan Valley, locally.

The valley got its name from a Bollywood movie  Betaab that was shot here.

Baisaran Valley 
Baisaran Valley, barely 5 kilometres from Pahalgam in Kashmir's Anantnag district, is a popular tourist attraction that has been dubbed "mini-Switzerland" due to its scenic splendour. It's a verdant meadow on a mountaintop flanked by snowcapped mountains and studded with thick pine woods. The optimum time to go to Baisaran is determined on the type of experience you wish to have. From January through March is the best time to visit if you want to experience the snow. Visit there during April and June to appreciate the foliage and lovely weather.

Religious significance
Pahalgam is one of the most important site for Hindus. Amarnath cave situated at 3,888 m (12,756 ft) is an important Hindu shrine located in Pahalgam.

Mythology
Lord Shiva is believed to impart the secret of immortality (Amrit Vachan) to Parvati in Pahalgam. Before entering Amarnath cave Shiv left nandi in Pahalgam, moon in Chandanwari, snakes in Sheshnag Lake, Ganesha on Mahaguna Parbat, five elements at Panchtarni. Mahaguna Parbat is lies at Nagaparbhat.

Environmental issues 
Annual tourist flow to the town produces much more waste than locals, overwhelming the local solid waste management system, and leading to dumping of waste throughout the town. 74% of the total municipal waste comes from the tourism sector. This waste issue increase waterborne disease downstream and other health issues, as well as polluting the local landscape.

Pahalgam Golf Course 

Pahalgam has a scenic 9-hole golf course; where championships are organized by the state government and private hotels in summer. The course closes in winter due to snow.
Pahalgam Golf Course is approximately 100 km from Srinagar and situated at an altitude of 2150 metres. Locals refer to the golf course as the 'plateau'. Portions of the plateau were occupied by the military in the days of the insurgency, leaving it out of bounds for tourists.

Transportation

Air
The nearest airport is Sheikh ul-Alam International Airport in Srinagar, 91 kilometres from Pahalgam.

Rail
The nearest railway station is [Bijbehara railway station] 45 km from Pahalgam.

Road
Pahalgam is well-connected with roads and highways. The NH 501 passes through Pahalgam alongside other intra-district roads.

Gallery

See also
 Kashmir
 Indian-administered Jammu and Kashmir
 Ladakh
 Kashmir Division
 Jammu Division
 Jammu
 Sonamarg
 Sopore
 Aharbal
 Kausar Nag
 Gulmarg
 Martand Sun Temple

References

Tourist attractions in India
Cities in Jammu and Kashmir
Tourist attractions in Jammu and Kashmir
Cities and towns in Anantnag district
Tourist attractions in Anantnag district